Ante Razov (born March 2, 1974) is an American soccer coach and former player who is an assistant coach for Los Angeles FC. One of the leading goal scorers in the history of Major League Soccer (MLS) and the all-time leading goal scorer for two current or former MLS clubs: the Chicago Fire with 76 goals and Chivas USA with 30 goals. In April 2007, Razov became the third player in MLS history to score 100 goals. Razov also played for the United States men's national soccer team.

Early life
Razov, who was born in a family of Croatian immigrants, spent his childhood in Fontana, California. He attended Fontana High School, and went on to play college soccer at UCLA.

Playing career

Club
Razov was drafted by the Los Angeles Galaxy in the third round of the 1996 MLS College Draft. He played two seasons in LA, but did not get much playing time, scoring just one goal, and signed with the expansion Chicago Fire prior to the 1998 season.  During his time with the Galaxy, he went on loan with the Sacramento Scorpions of USISL.

Razov spent the next seven years with Chicago, save a brief period in 2001 that he spent with Spanish second division club Racing de Ferrol. In his seven years with the Fire he led the club in goals and points five times (including club record 18 goals and 42 points in 2000). He is the club's all-time leader with 76 goals and 190 points. Razov was named to the MLS Best XI in 2003. With Chicago, he won the MLS Cup in 1998 and the US Open Cup in 1998, 2000, and 2003. Following a disappointing 2004 season and clashes with head coach Dave Sarachan, Razov was traded to the Columbus Crew in exchange for Tony Sanneh. However, one blemish in Razov's career was being stopped from the penalty spot in the 2003 MLS Cup. The Fire went on to lose the game, 4–2.

But Razov did not last long in Columbus. Even though he scored in the 2005 season opener, his tenure with the club lasted five games. Disagreement with head coach Greg Andrulis led to Razov's reuniting with his ex-coach with the Fire, Bob Bradley, at the MetroStars. He was acquired in exchange for John Wolyniec and a partial allocation. After the season, Bradley acquired Razov again, for Thiago Martins and another partial allocation.

On April 21, 2007, Razov scored his 100th career regular-season MLS goal. At 33 years old, he became the third player in MLS history to reach 100 goals. At the time, he trailed only Jaime Moreno and Jeff Cunningham, having passed Jason Kreis. All three joined MLS at its inception in 1996.

International
Razov received his first cap with the U.S. national team on March 25, 1995, against Uruguay. Although he never played in the World Cup, he scored a couple of key goals in qualifiers, including one against Guatemala in 2000 and Trinidad and Tobago in 2001. Overall, Razov scored six goals in 25 caps for the US.

International goals

|-
|1.
|June 6, 2000
|Foxboro Stadium, Foxboro, United States
|
|
|
|
|-
|2.
|June 11, 2000
|Giants Stadium, East Rutherford, United States
|
|
|
|
|-
|3.
|July 16, 2000
|Estadio Carlos Salazar Hijo, Mazatenango, Guatemala
|
|
|
|
|-
|4.
|November 15, 2000
|Barbados National Stadium, Bridgetown, Barbados
|
|
|
|
|-
|5.
|June 20, 2001
|Foxboro Stadium, Foxboro, United States
|
|
|
|
|-
|6.
|January 27, 2002
|Rose Bowl, Pasadena, United States
|
|
|
|
|}

Coaching career

In 2012, Razov was hired to serve as the LA Galaxy's U14 head coach. He replaced Craig Harrington, who was their coach for their first year in the Southern California Developmental Soccer League. Razov joined Seattle Sounders FC as an assistant coach under Sigi Schmid, his former college coach, in 2015.

Razov spent one season as an assistant coach for the LA Galaxy's senior squad under Curt Onalfo in 2017. In January 2018, he was announced as an assistant coach for expansion side Los Angeles FC under his former coach Bob Bradley.

Honors
United States
 CONCACAF Gold Cup: 2002

Chicago Fire
 MLS Cup: 1998
 Supporters' Shield: 2003
 Lamar Hunt U.S. Open Cup: 1998, 2000, 2003

References

External links 

1974 births
Living people
Sportspeople from Whittier, California
American people of Croatian descent
American soccer players
American expatriate soccer players
Soccer players from California
United States men's international soccer players
CONCACAF Gold Cup-winning players
2000 CONCACAF Gold Cup players
2002 CONCACAF Gold Cup players
Chicago Fire FC players
Columbus Crew players
LA Galaxy players
Racing de Ferrol footballers
New York Red Bulls players
Sacramento Scorpions players
Chivas USA players
Major League Soccer players
UCLA Bruins men's soccer players
Expatriate footballers in Spain
USISL players
Major League Soccer All-Stars
LA Galaxy draft picks
United States men's youth international soccer players
United States men's under-20 international soccer players
United States men's under-23 international soccer players
LA Galaxy non-playing staff
Seattle Sounders FC non-playing staff
Association football forwards
Los Angeles FC non-playing staff